Ancillina apicalis is a species of small sea snail, marine gastropod mollusk in the family Ancillariidae.

Description
The length of the shell varies between 6 mm and 8 mm.

Distribution
This marine species occurs off Hawaii.

References

 Severns M. (2011) Shells of the Hawaiian Islands - The Sea Shells. Conchbooks, Hackenheim. 564 pp.

External links
 

Ancillariidae
Gastropods described in 1979